David Christopher Rajsich (born September 28, 1951) is an American former professional baseball pitcher, who played in Major League Baseball (MLB) from 1978 to 1980 for the New York Yankees and Texas Rangers. He also played one season in Japan for the Hiroshima Toyo Carp in 1984. Rajsich, whose last name is pronounced "Ray-Sich", was a southpaw pitcher known as "The Blade" because he was so tall and thin (175).

Rajsich is the brother of former Major League outfielder Gary Rajsich, with whom he played on the St. Petersburg Pelicans in the Senior Professional Baseball Association. He is currently the pitching coach for the Eugene Emeralds.

References

External links

Major League Baseball pitchers
New York Yankees players
Texas Rangers players
Fort Lauderdale Yankees players
St. Petersburg Pelicans players
Syracuse Chiefs players
West Haven Yankees players
Tacoma Yankees players
Tucson Toros players
Charleston Charlies players
Wichita Aeros players
Denver Bears players
Oklahoma City 89ers players
Rochester Red Wings players
Louisville Redbirds players
Omaha Royals players
Hiroshima Toyo Carp players
American expatriate baseball players in Japan
Baseball players from Youngstown, Ohio
Arizona Wildcats baseball players
American people of Serbian descent
1951 births
Living people
Phoenix Bears baseball players